Apeiba membranacea is a species of tree in the family Malvaceae. It is native to North and South America.

References 

membranacea
Trees of Peru